Amphiphyllum is a group of plants in the family Rapateaceae described as a genus in 1931.

The only known species is Amphiphyllum rigidum, endemic to the Cerro Duida of Amazonas State in southern Venezuela.

References

Monotypic Poales genera
Rapateaceae
Endemic flora of Venezuela